Ceyranbatan (also, Dzheyranbatan) is a village and municipality in the Absheron Rayon of Azerbaijan.  It has a population of 5,969.

References 

Populated places in Absheron District